The 2005 WNBA season was the ninth season for the Charlotte Sting. The team finished the season with the worst record in the league. It was also the Sting's final season of play at the Charlotte Coliseum.

Offseason

WNBA Draft

Regular season

Season standings

Season schedule

Player stats

References

Charlotte Sting seasons
Charlotte
Charlotte Sting